Corey Brown (born 15 June 1976) is a retired Australian jockey who is best known for:
 riding Shocking to victory in the 2009 Melbourne Cup.  
 riding Rekindling to win the 2017 Melbourne Cup.
 riding Apache Cat to a string of Group 1 victories in 2008/09.
 appearing as a regular host on the racing industry related television show "Off the Rails" with Greg Radley and former jockey "Miracle" Malcolm Johnston.

References

http://www.news.com.au/sport/superracing/melbourne-cup/melbourne-cup-2017-final-finishing-order/news-story/ad8c76c0e8119812862eed5f9d36ae47

Australian jockeys
Living people
1976 births
People from Taree
Sportsmen from New South Wales